Ivan Mistrík (15 October 1935 – 8 June 1982) was a Slovak actor. He appeared in more than forty films from 1952 to 1982.

Selected filmography

References

External links 

1935 births
1982 deaths
Actors from Bratislava
Slovak male film actors
1982 suicides
Suicides in Czechoslovakia